Maj Git Elisabeth Karlsson (born 21 May 1980) is a Swedish politician who has served in the Riksdag since 2014.

Biography
Karlsson studied political science at the University of Gothenburg. She was elected to the Riksdag in 2014 and since 2016 has served as vice-group leader in the Left Party's Riksdag group.

References

Living people
1980 births
21st-century Swedish women politicians
Members of the Riksdag 2014–2018
Members of the Riksdag 2018–2022
Women members of the Riksdag
Members of the Riksdag 2022–2026
Members of the Riksdag from the Left Party (Sweden)